Mirko Teodorović (born 6 August 1978) is a former Serbian professional footballer who plays as a midfielder for Podrinje Mačvanska Mitrovica.

During his journeyman career, Teodorović spent seven and a half years in Hong Kong, representing six different clubs.

External links

 
 
 

Association football midfielders
Dreams Sports Club players
Expatriate footballers in Bosnia and Herzegovina
Expatriate footballers in Hong Kong
Expatriate footballers in Lebanon
First League of Serbia and Montenegro players
FK Loznica players
FK Metalac Gornji Milanovac players
FK Obilić players
FK Rad players
FK Srem players
FK Zemun players
Hong Kong First Division League players
Hong Kong Premier League players
Lebanese Premier League players
Nejmeh SC players
NK Žepče players
Sportspeople from Sremska Mitrovica
Premier League of Bosnia and Herzegovina players
Serbia and Montenegro expatriate footballers
Serbia and Montenegro expatriate sportspeople in Bosnia and Herzegovina
Serbia and Montenegro footballers
Serbian expatriate footballers
Serbian expatriate sportspeople in Hong Kong
Serbian expatriate sportspeople in Lebanon
Serbian First League players
Serbian footballers
Serbian SuperLiga players
Shatin SA players
Sun Hei SC players
Tuen Mun SA players
Yokohama FC Hong Kong players
1978 births
Living people